William Rocky Gray (born July 2, 1974) is a drummer and guitarist who has been part of the Arkansas metal scene since the early 1990s. He was the drummer for the rock band Evanescence from 2003-2007 and the lead guitarist for Solus Deus. He is the lead guitarist for Living Sacrifice and the drummer for Soul Embraced, Mourningside, Machina, and We Are the Fallen. Gray also released a solo album titled Accursed (2015).

History

In 1991, Gray joined the grindcore band Shredded Corpse with David S. The band released two albums and eventually disbanded in 1998. In 1997 he formed Soul Embraced with David S. and broke up in 1998. From 1991 to 1998, Gray played for many bands, with Shredded Corpse being his main gig. In 1998, Gray joined the Christian death metal band Living Sacrifice with Arthur Green and Matthew Putman.

In 1999, Gray reunited Soul Embraced with his brother-in-law Chad Moore and fellow Living Sacrifice member Lance Garvin, and released their debut EP, The Fleshless. In 2000, Living Sacrifice Embraced released their fifth album, The Hammering Process, which was Gray, Green and Putman's first release with the band. Later that year, Soul Embraced released their debut studio album, For the Incomplete. In 2002, Living Sacrifice released their sixth album Conceived in Fire, and Soul Embraced released their sophomore album, This Is My Blood. Gray formed the band Kill System in 2002 with Garvin, Moore, John LeCompt, and recorded their debut self-titled album. They disbanded in 2003. In early 2003, Gray left the band to play drums live for the rock band Evanescence; he was replaced by Cory Brandan Putman.

After Gray left Living Sacrifice, Soul Embraced released their album Immune. In 2003, Evanescence released their debut album, Fallen, which featured a cover of Soul Embraced's song "My Tourniquet". In 2005, Gray got together with Garvin and Bruce Fitzhugh to record three additional songs for Living Sacrifice's greatest hits, In Memoriam. Later that year, Gray joined Evanescence guitarist John LeCompt in the band Machina.

In 2006, Gray joined the horror-themed band Fatal Thirteen (also stylized as Fatal 13) as the drummer. Gray also formed his own solo project, 3 for Sorrow, and another project with his brother-in-law, called The Burning. Both projects ended almost as abruptly they started. Gray stated that The Burning was put aside as he was focusing on other projects.

After five years of being disbanded, Living Sacrifice reunited and released their sophomore EP, Death Machine. Before the band reunited, Gray left Evanescence along with LeCompt. In 2008, Soul Embraced released their fourth album, Dead Alive. In 2009, Gray and LeCompt formed a project with fellow ex-Evanescence member Ben Moody and two other members (Carly Smithson, Marty O'Brien) called We Are the Fallen.

In 2010, Living Sacrifice released their seventh album The Infinite Order, which featured many guest spots, including David Bunton of The Showdown and Joe Musten of Advent. In 2012, Gray produced an EP by then-local band Every Knee Shall Bow. The band soon after signed to Rottweiler Records, which Soul Embraced signed soon after. Gray joined Solus Deus soon after they started. In 2012, they released their debut, self-titled EP, and in 2013 their sophomore release,  The Bloodtrail as well as their third EP, The Plague in 2017, featuring Darryl McDaniels from Run-D.M.C.

In 2013, both Living Sacrifice and Soul Embraced released albums: Ghost Thief, which featured artists such as Ryan Clark of Demon Hunter and Dave Peters of Throwdown and Mythos, which featured Fitzhugh.

In 2014, Fatal Thirteen broke up. Three other projects emerged, including Creepy Carnival, which Gray formed with Wretched Graverobber and Spano Graverobber of the horror punk band Grave Robber, and Jeff Bowie of Descended from Wolves, Mourningside, and Soul Embraced. The other projects were Even Devils Die, another project with LeCompt, and his other solo project, under the name Rocky Gray.

In 2015, Gray recorded a solo album, titled Accursed, and many of the tracks appeared on the soundtrack for Killing Floor 2 (released by Tripwire Interactive; soundtrack released by Solid State Records)  Gray stated that he wanted Living Sacrifice and Soul Embraced to have a new release by 2016. In 2015, Gray composed the score for the film The Barn and the video game based on the movie.

In 2016, Gray was nominated for a "Best Scorer" award for his work on The Barn. Later that year, Gray, alongside longtime friend LeCompt, joined local Arkansas gothic rock band Cryptic Memoirs.

Gray composed music for the 2017 film 10/31, and composed music for the upcoming film Cryptids. Gray also wrote "The Samhain Slasher" for the 10/31 anthology.

Personal life
Rocky Gray is married to Renée Gray, and they have two children, Abraham and Madison. They live in Little Rock, Arkansas. His brother-in-law, Chad Moore, plays with Gray in Soul Embraced (vocals) and played with him in Kill System (bass) and the Burning (vocals).

Bands
Current
 Rocky Gray (solo) – guitars, drums, bass (2014–present)
 Soul Embraced – lead guitar (1997–2009, 2014–present), rhythm guitar (1997–2006, 2014–present), bass (1997–2006), drums (2009–2014), backing vocals (1999–present)
 Mourningside – drums (2004–present)
 Living Sacrifice – lead guitar, backing vocals (1998–2003, 2005, 2008–present)
 Machina – drums (2005–present)
 Even Devils Die – guitar, keyboards, programming (2014–present)
 Creepy Carnival - guitar (2014–present)
 Cryptic Memoirs - drums, guitar (2013–present)

Former
 Chalice – drums (1991)
 Shredded Corpse – vocals, guitar, keyboards, bass (1991–1998)
 Sickshine – drums (1993–1995)
 PainGod (later known as Flesh Compressor) – (1994–1995)
 Seminal Death – vocals, guitar (1995)
 Thy Pain – guitar, vocals (2002)
 Kill System – guitar (2002–2003)
 Evanescence – drums (2002–2007)
 The Burning – guitar (2005–2006)
 3 for Sorrow – drums, bass and guitar (2005–2006)
 Fatal Thirteen – drums (2006–2014)
 We Are the Fallen – drums (2009–2012)
 Solus Deus – lead guitar, backing vocals (2012–2017)

Touring
 Bleeding Through – drums (2008) 
 The Killer and the Star – drums (2009–present)

Timeline

Selected discography
 With Soul Embraced
 The Fleshless (1999)
 For the Incomplete (2000)
 This Is My Blood (2002)
 Immune (2003)
 Dead Alive (2008)
 Mythos (2013)

 With Living Sacrifice
 The Hammering Process (2000)
 Subtle Alliance (2002)
 Conceived in Fire (2002)
 In Memoriam (2005)
 Death Machine (2008)
 The Infinite Order (2010)
 Ghost Thief (2013)

With Evanescence
 The Open Door (2006)

With Kill System
 Kill System (2002)

With Machina
 Machina EP (2007)
 To Live And Die in the Garden of Eden (2012)

With We Are the Fallen
 Tear the World Down (2010)

With Solus Deus
 Solus Deus (2012)
 The Bloodtrail (2014)
 The Plague (2016)

As Rocky Gray
 Accursed (2015)

With Cryptic Memoirs 
 Weight of the World EP (2017)

As scorer
 The Barn (2015)

 Other credits
 Inner War – Inner War (producer, 1999)
 Thy Pain – More Than Suffering (producer, 2002)
 Fatal Thirteen – Music From the Soundproof Torture Chamber (producer, 2006)
 Austrian Death Machine – Double Brutal (guitar solo on track 13, 2009)
 Believer – Gabriel (guitars, 2009)
 At Wars End – Take Off the Mask (producer, 2012)
 Every Knee Shall Bow - Weary Warrior (producer, 2012)
 Project 86 – Wait for the Siren (drums, 2012)
 Lust Control - Tiny Little Dots (producer, 2013)
 Final Surrender - Empty Graves (producer, 2013)
 Abated Mass of Flesh - Brutal Death (mastering, 2013)
 At Wars End - One Way Ticket EP (producer, 2014)

CrimeWave
In 2005, Rocky launched a clothing line called CrimeWave Clothing, which he has since abandoned. CrimeWave is also the name of Rocky's record label, which currently features Fatal Thirteen.

References

1974 births
20th-century American drummers
21st-century American drummers
21st-century American singers
American heavy metal drummers
American heavy metal guitarists
American heavy metal singers
American male guitarists
American male drummers
American male singer-songwriters
American performers of Christian music
American rock songwriters
Bleeding Through members
Christian metal musicians
Evanescence members
Guitarists from Arkansas
Living people
Living Sacrifice members
People from Jacksonville, Arkansas
Singer-songwriters from Arkansas
Soul Embraced members
We Are the Fallen members